Leonard "Bubba" McDowell (born November 4, 1966) is an American football coach and former player. He played professionally as a safety for seven seasons in the National Football League (NFL) with the Houston Oilers and Carolina Panthers.  McDowell played college football at the University of Miami.

Coaching career
After the departure of Eric Dooley, McDowell was named the head coach of the Prairie View A&M Panthers football team on January 4, 2022.

Head coaching record

References

External links
 Prairie View A&M Panthers bio

1966 births
Living people
American football safeties
Carolina Panthers players
Houston Oilers players
Miami Hurricanes football players
Prairie View A&M Panthers football coaches
People from Brevard County, Florida
People from Fort Gaines, Georgia
Coaches of American football from Florida
Players of American football from Florida
African-American coaches of American football
African-American players of American football
20th-century African-American sportspeople
21st-century African-American sportspeople
Ed Block Courage Award recipients